The 1995–96 Princeton Tigers men's basketball team represented Princeton University  in intercollegiate college basketball during the 1995–96 NCAA Division I men's basketball season. The head coach was Pete Carril and the team captain was Sydney Johnson. The team played its home games in the Jadwin Gymnasium on the University campus in Princeton, New Jersey.  The team was the champion of the Ivy League, which earned them an invitation to the 64-team 1996 NCAA Division I men's basketball tournament where they were seeded thirteenth in the Southeast Region.  This was the final year that Carril coached the men's basketball team.  He would be succeeded by assistant coach Bill Carmody.  Carrill retired as the Ivy League's winningest coach in terms of overall victories, conference victories and conference championships. By the end of the decade, Princeton achieved a 76.1% (210–66) winning percentage, which was the eighth best in the nation.

Using the Princeton offense, the team posted a 22–7 overall record and a 13–2 conference record. After losing the regular season finale at The Palestra against Penn to finish the regular season tied for the conference championship on March 5, the team won its March 9, 1996, one-game Ivy League playoff game against Penn in Bethlehem, Pennsylvania, at the Stabler Arena by a 63–56 margin in overtime for the Ivy League Championship and an invitation to the NCAA Division I men's basketball tournament. The win ended an eight-game losing streak to Penn. The win earned the team the conference automatic bid to the 1996 NCAA tournament and following the game head coach Pete Carril announced his retirement. On March 14, the 13th seeded team was matched against the defending national champion and fourth seeded UCLA Bruins in the NCAA Division I men's basketball tournament Southeast Regional first round game at the RCA Dome in Indianapolis, Indiana. The team fell behind 41–34 with over six minutes remaining, but held UCLA scoreless the rest of the game, winning 43–41 on the strength of a typical Princeton offense, Steve Goodrich to Gabe Lewullis bounce pass backdoor basket. During the game, Sydney Johnson's leadership held the team together early when the UCLA team looked strong. It was the final upset the team produced in Carril's career, as two days later, the Tigers season ended with a 63–41 loss to Mississippi State in the second round.

The team was led by first team All-Ivy League selections Steve Goodrich and Johnson.  The team won the eighth of twelve consecutive national statistical championships in scoring defense with a 51.7 points allowed average.  Goodrich led the Ivy League with a 60.3 field goal percentage.

References

Princeton Tigers men's basketball seasons
Princeton Tigers
Prince
Prince
Princeton